Alan McCormack (born 18 August 1956) is an Irish former cyclist. He competed in the individual road race event at the 1976 Summer Olympics.

References

External links
 

1956 births
Living people
Irish male cyclists
Olympic cyclists of Ireland
Cyclists at the 1976 Summer Olympics
People from County Tipperary